Ložina is a settlement in the Haloze Hills in the Municipality of Podlehnik in eastern Slovenia, right on the border with Croatia. The area traditionally belonged to the Styria region. It is now included in the Drava Statistical Region.

References

External links
Ložina on Geopedia

Populated places in the Municipality of Podlehnik